Boy 7 is a 2015 German action film based on the eponymous novel by Mirjam Mous.

Cast 
 David Kross - Sam (Boy 7)
 Emilia Schüle - Lara (Girl 8)
  - Louis (Boy 6)
 Jens Harzer - Isaak
 Liv Lisa Fries - Safira
  - Boy 35
  - Direktor Fredersen

See also 
 Boy 7 (Netherlands, 2015)

References

External links 

2015 action thriller films
German action thriller films
Films about amnesia
Films based on Dutch novels
2010s German films